C'è sempre un ma! is a 1942 Italian "white-telephones" drama film directed by Luigi Zampa and starring Carla Del Poggio.

Cast
 Carla Del Poggio as Carla
 Adriana Benetti as Giulia
 Rubi Dalma as Laura  
 Jone Morino as Isabella
 Aroldo Tieri as Carletto
 Armando Francioli as Fabrizio
 Carlo Micheluzzi as Il padre di Fabrizio

External links

1942 films
1942 drama films
1940s Italian-language films
Italian black-and-white films
Films directed by Luigi Zampa
Films with screenplays by Cesare Zavattini
Italian drama films
1940s Italian films